Birch River Ecological Reserve is an ecological reserve in the Porcupine Provincial Forest, Manitoba, Canada. It was established in 2005 under the Manitoba Ecological Reserves Act.

See also
 List of ecological reserves in Manitoba
 List of protected areas of Manitoba

References

External links
 iNaturalist: Birch River Ecological Reserve

Protected areas established in 1989
Ecological reserves of Manitoba
Nature reserves in Manitoba
Protected areas of Manitoba

Parkland Region, Manitoba